Pradoshia  is a Gram-positive and spore-forming genus of bacteria from the family of Bacillaceae with one known species (Pradoshia eiseniae). Pradoshia eiseniae is capable to metabolize 3-nitropropionic acid. Pradoshia eiseniae has been isolated from the gut of the earthworm Eisenia fetida.

References

Bacillaceae
Bacteria genera
Monotypic bacteria genera
Bacteria described in 2019